Director's Special, commonly referred to by its abbreviation DSP, is a brand of Indian whisky, manufactured by United Spirits Ltd (USL), a Diageo Group company. It is molasses based. Shaw Wallace won a legal battle in US courts against the Scotch Whisky Association (SWA) to sell the product as "whisky".

History
DSP was originally manufactured by Shaw Wallace. 

United Spirits Ltd (USL), a subsidiary of the United Breweries Group (UB Group), acquired Shaw Wallace in July 2005. On 1 April 2008, Shaw Wallace was merged with USL and DSP officially became a USL brand. In April 2008, the UB Group appointed London-based design firm Claessens International to create new packaging.

DSP Black
DSP Black, expanded to Director's Special Black, is an extension of the Director's Special brand into the deluxe whisky segment of the Indian market. It was launched in 1988 by Shaw Wallace.

Sales
The following table shows the annual sales of Director's Special and DSP Black:

See also
 List of Indian beverages

References

External links
 USL official site
 USL site DSP Black page
 UB Group official site

Indian whisky
Products introduced in 1988
Alcoholic drink brands
United Spirits brands